Neil Patrick McPhee (born October 14, 1943) is an American former college baseball coach and second baseman. He played college baseball and college hockey at Northeastern University from 1961 to 1965. He was the head coach of the Northeastern Huskies baseball program from 1986 to 2014.

Playing career
McPhee was a standout second baseman at Northeastern for four seasons, including a trip to the 1964 NCAA Tournament.  McPhee also played ice hockey for the Huskies, completing two seasons before losing his senior season to a broken arm.  The Minnesota Twins made him a fifth round pick in the 1965 MLB Draft, and he played three seasons in the Twins organization, reaching Class-A.  McPhee was inducted into the NU Athletic Hall of Fame in 1980.

Coaching career
In 1967, McPhee hung up his spikes and turned to coaching.  He began at Newton South High School in Newton, Massachusetts, where he coached baseball and ice hockey from 1967 to 1985.  After several league titles and appearances in Eastern Massachusetts tournaments, McPhee was hired as the tenth head baseball coach at Northeastern.  In his 28 years with the Huskies, he claimed three Conference Tournament titles (all in the America East Conference), two regular season crowns, and appeared in three NCAA Tournaments.  He saw fourteen players drafted, including Carlos Peña and Adam Ottavino; several other players have signed professional contracts.  McPhee led the Huskies to nineteen winning seasons and was named NAC Coach of the Year twice.  After he announced his planned retirement at the close of the 2014 season, the Huskies named Mike Glavine, another McPhee product who played in the major leagues, as his successor.  Glavine succeeded McPhee following the end of the season, in which Northeastern finished 5th in the CAA and went 1-2 in the conference tournament.

Head coaching record
This table shows McPhee's record as a head coach at the Division I level.

References

External links

Living people
1943 births
Baseball shortstops
Boston State College alumni
High school baseball coaches in the United States
High school ice hockey coaches in the United States
Northeastern Huskies baseball coaches
Northeastern Huskies baseball players
Northeastern Huskies men's ice hockey players
St. Cloud Rox players
Wilson Tobs players
Wisconsin Rapids Twins players